Yau Tong Estate is a public housing estate in Yau Tong, Kwun Tong, Kowloon, Hong Kong, located near Yau Tong station of the MTR.

Background
Yau Tong Estate was a resettlement estate with 23 blocks built in 1964, 1965 and 1971 respectively, all of which were demolished in the 1990s. The estate was originally redeveloped in phases. However, the airport relocation and MTR Tseung Kwan O line construction caused delays in the redevelopment project. In the end, nearly all blocks were demolished at one time in the late 1990s, rather than by phases.

After redevelopment, four blocks were built in 2000 and 2002 respectively. In 2002, Ching Mei House (Block A) of Yau Mei Court was converted from Home Ownership Scheme to rental housing, and renamed Mei Tong House.

Houses

See also
 Yau Mei Court and Yau Chui Court
 Public housing estates in Yau Tong

References

Yau Tong
Public housing estates in Hong Kong
Residential buildings completed in 1964
Residential buildings completed in 1965
Residential buildings completed in 1971
Residential buildings completed in 2000
Residential buildings completed in 2002
1964 establishments in Hong Kong